The Gotham Film & Media Institute (also simply the Gotham), formerly known as the Independent Filmmaker Project (IFP), is a membership-based, not-for-profit organization dedicated to independent film. It offers programs that assist independent filmmakers in connecting with film-industry professionals and, ultimately, audiences, and presents the annual Gotham Awards.

It was founded in 1979 by independent filmmakers as the Independent Filmmaker Project (IFP). Under the IFP umbrella, the New York City organization has over 5,000 members. Affiliated regional organizations are based in Chicago, Minneapolis-Saint Paul, Phoenix, and Seattle. Since March 2019, Jeffrey Sharp has been the executive director of the organization.

In January 2021, the IFP announced its rebranding as the Gotham Film & Media Institute.

References

External links

Non-profit organizations based in New York City
Independent films
Film markets
Cinema of New York City
Organizations established in 1979
1979 establishments in New York City